The 1975 La Flèche Wallonne was the 39th edition of La Flèche Wallonne cycle race and was held on 17 April 1975. The race started and finished in Verviers. The race was won by André Dierickx of the Rokado team.

General classification

References

1975 in road cycling
1975
1975 in Belgian sport